The University of Florida College of Nursing is the nursing school of the University of Florida. The UF College of Nursing is Florida's Flagship nursing program. Established in 1956, the College of Nursing is located on the university's Gainesville, Florida main campus.  The college is fully accredited, and is one of six academic colleges and schools that constitute the J. Hillis Miller Health Science Center.

The college is ranked among the top ten percent of all baccalaureate and graduate degree-granting nursing schools in the United States.  The average overall grade point average (GPA) for incoming upperclassmen to the Bachelor of Science in Nursing (B.S.N.) program is 3.57.  The college currently has 70 faculty members and 930 total students, including 230 graduate students, of which 48 are doctoral candidates.

80% of UF BSN graduates go on to graduate school within three years of graduation.

U.S. News & World Report ranks the college at 32nd overall among all U.S. nursing schools.

The college received more than $5 million in research grants last year.

The current Dean is Anna M. McDaniel.

See also 
 University of Florida College of Dentistry
 University of Florida College of Public Health and Health Professions
 University of Florida College of Medicine
 University of Florida College of Pharmacy
 University of Florida College of Veterinary Medicine

References

External links
Official website
Gainesville Sun info about the College
Branch campus in Jacksonville info
Overview of the College
Capital Campaign for the College
Gainesville Sun article about the College

Nursing schools in Florida
Nursing
Educational institutions established in 1956
1956 establishments in Florida